The 1998–99 West Midlands (Regional) League season was the 99th in the history of the West Midlands (Regional) League, an English association football competition for semi-professional and amateur teams based in the West Midlands county, Shropshire, Herefordshire, Worcestershire and southern Staffordshire.

Premier Division

The Premier Division featured 15 clubs which competed in the division last season, along with five new clubs.
Clubs promoted from Division One North:
Bandon
Lawson Mardon Star, who also changed name to Star
Clubs promoted from Division One South:
Smethwick Rangers
Tipton Town
Plus:
Dudley Town, reformed after resigning from the Southern Football League in 1997

League table

References

External links

1998–99
9